This is a table of the ranks and insignia of the Canadian Armed Forces. As the Canadian Armed Forces is officially bilingual, the French language ranks are presented following the English (in italics).

Commander-in-Chief insignia
The Commander-in-Chief of the Canadian Armed Forces rank insignia is a special sleeve braid embellished with the crest of the Royal arms of Canada and this same embroidered crest is worn on the shoulder straps.

The rank insignia for the Commander-in-Chief.

Officer rank insignia

The rank insignia for commissioned officers for the navy, army, and air force.

Non-commissioned member (NCM) rank insignia
The following are the rank insignia for non-commissioned members for the navy, army and air force respectively.

NCM rank insignia for the rank of petty officer 1st class/warrant officer and above are worn on the lower sleeve, while those for the rank of petty officer 2nd class/sergeant and below are worn on the upper sleeve. The Royal Canadian Navy has directed its personnel to use the English rank titles for OR-1 through OR-5, but they are not yet legally in force pursuant to the National Defence Act, as they are not yet updated in the King's Regulations and Orders issued by the Governor-in-Council.

Rank slip-ons

The tables above describe the rank insignia worn on the service dress jacket. On DEU shirts, sweaters, and outerwear; and operational dress shirts and jackets, rank insignia are worn on slip-ons with the word "CANADA" or a regimental/branch title embroidered underneath. Flag/general officers' slip-ons include only the crown, crossed sabre and baton, and maple leaves worn on the shoulder straps; they do not include the braid worn on the sleeve. Army NCM slip-ons for DEU shirts, sweaters, and outerwear display only the word "CANADA" or a regimental/branch title, rank insignia being worn instead as enamelled metal pins on collar points or lapels.

Service stripes
From 1955 to 1968 Militia personnel were permitted to wear service insignia on the right jacket sleeve. There were one to five silver chevrons on drab backing for every two years of service or a maple leaf in silver thread on a drab cloth circle to represent 10 years of service. Chevron points were worn either up or down; even official documents and photos were confused on the matter. Further awards after 10 years were believed covered by the Canadian Forces Decoration, which was awarded after 12 years and a clasp added for every 10 years afterwards.

Qualifying service could include prior active service in the active reserves of the Royal Canadian Navy and Royal Canadian Air Force or the regular or territorial forces of a fellow Commonwealth member nation. Service in Canadian Army reserve forces units (like the regular reserve, supplementary reserve and reserve militia) did not count. The awarding of Service Stripes ceased in 1968 after the unification of the Canadian Armed Forces.

Canadian Army distinctive corps insignia 
Every branch or corps of the Canadian Army uses a distinctive colour. Applicable only to officers, they are indicated by coloured borders of rank insignia on DEU shirt and sweater slip-ons and on mess dress.

Distinctive rank names
Some branches and regiments use distinctive job titles for privates in those regiments:

Additionally, the Royal Regiment of Canadian Artillery uses "bombardier" for corporals and "master bombardier" for master corporal. In the guard regiments, warrant officers are known as "colour sergeants" and second lieutenants are known as "ensigns".

Evolution of Royal Canadian Navy rank and insignia
When the Royal Canadian Navy was established in 1910, it kept with Royal Navy traditions and adopted sleeve braid with an executive curl for rank insignia. "Wavy" sleeve braid was adopted for the Royal Canadian Naval Volunteer Reserve (RCNVR) and rings of narrow interwoven gold lace for the Royal Canadian Navy Reserve (RCNR). Other variations in rank insignia included sky blue lace with a diamond shaped loop for officers of the Women's Royal Canadian Naval Service, and warranted Royal Canadian Sea Cadet Corps officers, who had a small anchor in place of the executive curl.

Following the Second World War, the Royal Canadian Navy was reorganized with a single reserve component. In 1946 the distinctive wavy gold braid of the reserves gave way to the straight braided executive curl of the regular force until 1968. With the integration of the Canadian Forces the sea element was designated as Canadian Forces Maritime Command. Unembellished straight braid became the common rank insignia for officers of both the regular and reserve forces. The executive curl appeared only on navy mess dress.

On 5 March 2010, the Canadian House of Commons passed a motion (moved by Guy Lauzon) recommending the executive curl be reinstated on the Canadian navy uniform. Subsequently, in recognition of the Canadian Naval centennial, Peter MacKay, Minister of National Defence, authorized the use of the executive curl for the Canadian Navy on 2 May 2010. The insignia became effective on 11 June 2010, on the occasion of the Pacific Canadian Naval International Fleet Review parade of nations in Victoria, B.C.

More than 54 countries, including Canada and 18 other of the 22 Commonwealth navies, use the insignia. Most navies that do not use the executive curl insignia, such as the United States Navy and the French Navy, substitute a star or other national device above the top row of lace.

Timeline of changes (sleeves only)

Evolution of Canadian Army ranks and insignia
Prior to unification in 1968, the Canadian Army used rank insignia identical to the British Army. When the universal CF green uniform was adopted at unification, Land Command, like the other services, used gold braid sleeve stripes as rank insignia. Wehndistinctive environmental uniforms were adopted in the mid-1980s, the army retained the green uniform with gold stripes. 

On 8 July 2013, Minister of National Defence Peter MacKay announced the intention to reintroduce a more traditional style Canadian Army officers' rank insignia. Instead of the sleeve stripe rank insignia used since unification, officers would use the older St Edward's Crown and Star of the Order of the Bath insignia, commonly called "pips and crowns". Gorget patches were also restored for officers of the rank of colonel or higher. The new insignia for officers, instead of using the current British rank insignia for brigadier (used in the Canadian Army until 1968), had the pre-1920 brigadier-general insignia (crossed sabre and baton) instead.

On 2 April 2016, the Commander of the Canadian Army announced that general officers would revert to the unification-era rank insignia worn between 1968 and 2013. This rank insignia is based on the shoulder board rank insignia of Royal Canadian Navy flag officers. The rank insignia of general officers now consists of a crown, crossed sabre and baton, and a series of maple leaves on shoulder straps. Additionally, general officers wear one broad gold band on each of the lower sleeves of the service dress tunic.

On the centenary of the Battle of Vimy Ridge, 9 April 2017, the Bath Star pip was replaced by the "Vimy Star". It depicts a maple leaf and is surrounded by the Latin motto  ("we stand on guard for thee"). Commissioned officers of the household guard regiments (Governor General's Foot Guards, Canadian Grenadier Guards, and Governor General's Horse Guards), plus Army personnel stationed to the seasonal Ceremonial Guard, use the Guards Star in place of the Vimy Star on their shoulder boards.

Timeline of changes

Evolution of Royal Canadian Air Force rank and insignia 

Canadian Air Force ranks and insignia originally were taken from the Royal Air Force practice. Upon unification, the Air Command used identical ranks and insignia as the Land Command. When Air-specific blue DEUs were introduced, the gold rank insignia were retained.

In April 2015, the Royal Canadian Air Force adopted new rank insignia reminiscent of the pre-unification RCAF system. The new officer rank insignia uses pearl-grey-on-black rank stripes instead of gold. Non-commissioned members (NCMs) rank insignia is pearl grey instead of gold. The colour gold found elsewhere on the uniform was also changed to pearl-grey. The air force rank of private, formerly indicated by one chevron, became aviator (Fr: aviateur), and is indicated by a horizontally-aligned two-bladed propeller. All other ranks titles remain as they were.

Timeline of changes

Mess dress
Contrary to the Royal Canadian Navy and the Canadian Army, mess dress uniform ranks for officers of the Royal Canadian Air Force follow the naval pattern, without the executive curl. General officers do not wear shoulder straps with this order of dress.

See also 

 Former ranks of the Canadian Forces
 Historic Royal Canadian Air Force ranks (1924–1968)
 Ranks and insignia of NATO
 List of comparative military ranks
 Comparative army officer ranks of the Americas
 Uniforms of the Canadian Armed Forces
 Cadets Canada Elemental Ranks

References

External links
 Canadian Armed Forces ranks and appointment insignia – official site with images of rank insignia for Navy, Army and Air Force.

Canadian Armed Forces
 
Canada